The 1994–95 Mighty Ducks of Anaheim season was the second season in franchise history. The Ducks missed the playoffs for the second year in a row. Despite a Conference-worst 5–18–1 road record, the team played well at home with an 11–9–4 record. On April 4, the team traded enforcer Stu Grimson, Mark Ferner and the team's sixth-round choice in the 1996 NHL Entry Draft to the Detroit Red Wings in exchange for Mike Sillinger and Jason York. Twenty-year-old rookie Paul Kariya was a candidate for the Calder Memorial Trophy as the NHL's top rookie, scoring 18 goals and 39 points in 47 games (the award ultimately went to the Quebec Nordiques' Peter Forsberg).

Off-season
Defenseman Randy Ladouceur is named team captain, following the departure of Troy Loney.

Regular season
The Mighty Ducks finished last in power-play percentage (11.39%) and penalty-kill percentage (75.65%) in the NHL. The team was also shut out an NHL-high six times during the regular season.

Final standings

Schedule and results

Regular season

Player statistics

Skaters

Goaltenders

† Denotes player spent time with another team before joining the Mighty Ducks. Stats reflect time with the Mighty Ducks only.
‡ Denotes player was traded mid-season. Stats reflect time with the Mighty Ducks only.

Transactions

Trades

Signings

Free agents

Draft picks
Anaheim's draft picks at the 1994 NHL Entry Draft held at the Hartford Civic Center in Hartford, Connecticut.

Notes
 The Mighty Ducks acquired this pick as the result of a trade on June 29, 1994 that sent Ottawa's third-round pick in 1994 (55th overall) to Tampa Bay in exchange for a fourth-round pick in 1995 and this pick.
Tampa Bay previously acquired this pick as the result of a trade on March 21, 1994 that sent Joe Reekie to Washington in exchange for Enrico Ciccone, Tampa Bay's conditional fifth-round pick in 1995 and this pick.
 The Mighty Ducks third-round pick went to the Montreal Canadiens as the result of a trade on August 10, 1993 that sent Todd Ewen and Patrik Carnback to Anaheim in exchange for this pick (54th overall).
 The Mighty Ducks ninth-round pick went to the Ottawa Senators as the result of a trade on June 28, 1994 that sent a third-round pick in 1994 (55th overall) to Anaheim in exchange for Sean Hill and this pick (210th overall).

See also 
1994–95 NHL season

References
 Mighty Ducks on Hockey Database

A
A
Anaheim Ducks seasons
Mighty Ducks of Anaheim
Mighty Ducks of Anaheim